"Underneath" is the fourth single by Finnish singer Tarja Turunen from her third album What Lies Beneath. It was released on 22 April 2011 only as a digital version. The release has been confirmed for Austria, Switzerland, Russia, Poland, Finland, Sweden, Ukraine, France and UK. It includes two unreleased versions of the song, plus a non-album track in Spanish. An exclusive limited edition 7 inches 2 track vinyl single was released in America on May 24, 2013.

Track listing
 "Underneath" (Radio Mix) – 4:28
 "Underneath" (Orchestral Mix) – 5:01
 "Montañas De Silencio" – 4:26

References

External links
 

2011 singles
Songs written by Johnny Andrews
Tarja Turunen songs
Songs written by Tarja Turunen